The Finance (No.2) Act 2010 is an Act of the Parliament of the United Kingdom enacting the June 2010 United Kingdom Budget. The Chancellor of the Exchequer delivers the annual budget speech outlining changes in spending, tax, duty and other financial matters. However, in 2010 there was an earlier budget in March. The respective year's Finance Act is the mechanism to enact the changes. Levels of Excise Duties, Value Added Tax, Income Tax, Corporation Tax and Capital Gains Tax) are often modified.

The rules governing the various taxation methods are contained within the relevant taxation acts. (For instance Capital Gains Tax Legislation is contained within Taxation of Chargeable Gains Act 1992). The Finance Act details amendments to be made to each one of these Acts.

References

United Kingdom Acts of Parliament 2010
2010 in economics
Tax legislation in the United Kingdom